Porto Real (Portuguese for the Royal Port) is a village in the central part of Príncipe Island in São Tomé and Príncipe. Its population is 296 (2012 census). Porto Real is located southwest of the island capital of Santo António. Porto Real is home to an abandoned plantation called Roça Porto Real, which lies in ruins.

Population history

References

Populated places in the Autonomous Region of Príncipe